The John Smith Memorial Mace (known as the Observer Mace from 1954 to 1995) is an annual debating tournament (British Parliamentary format) contested by universities in England, Ireland, Scotland and Wales.

The equivalent competition for secondary schools is the ESU Schools Mace.

History
The competition was founded in 1954 by the journalist Kenneth Harris of The Observer newspaper, and was sponsored by the newspaper until 1995.  It was then renamed the John Smith Memorial Mace in honour of the British Labour Party leader John Smith, who won the tournament as a member of the Glasgow University team in 1962, and died in 1994.

The competition has been held annually since 1954, except for 1977, when no tournament was organised.  In the early years, neither Oxbridge debating society (the Oxford Union and Cambridge Union) participated. Glasgow University Union has been the most successful institution in the competition's history, winning the tournament 16 times, most recently in 2018.

In addition to John Smith, other notable former winners include Charles Kennedy, Donald Dewar, John Nicolson, Lord Hunt of Wirral and Professor Anthony Clare.

Format
From 1993, the competition has been run by the English-Speaking Union, with assistance from regional convenors.  Four regional tournaments are held each year for universities in England, Ireland, Scotland and Wales.  The Irish tournament is open to teams from both the Republic of Ireland and Northern Ireland. The winners of these four regional competitions then go on to face each other in the International Final, which is held each spring to determine the overall champions.

No International Final has been held since 2019, when the English-Speaking Union removed its sponsorship of the competition. Only the Scottish Mace (which served as the regional qualifier and national championship for Scotland) and the Irish Mace (which served as the regional qualifier and national championship for the Republic of Ireland and Northern Ireland) have continued.

All debates in the competition are held using the British Parliamentary debate format. Speeches in the International Final and regional finals are seven minutes long, which is similar to most other British Parliamentary format tournaments, where speeches are usually seven or five minutes long. Until 2001, speeches in the tournament's finals were ten minutes long.

The Mace is considered by many debaters to be effectively an overall championship for the United Kingdom and Ireland, with the regional qualifying tournament serving effectively as national championships for England, Scotland and Wales. The Irish Times National Debating Championship served as the Irish qualifier for the Mace in the 1960s, but is now run separately.

Past champions

Most victories

Victories by country

Winners of recent national qualifying tournaments

English Mace

Irish Mace

Scottish Mace

Welsh Mace

England & Wales Mace

Prior to the 2001-2 academic year, England and Wales held a combined qualifying tournament for the International Final of the Mace. At the time, the winners of the Irish, Scottish and English/Welsh tournaments qualified for the International Final automatically, while runners-up from the events qualified for a repechage debate which determined the fourth team in the International Final. After the 2000-1 academic year, England and Wales began holding separate qualifying tournaments and the repechage was abolished.

See also
 English-Speaking Union
 ESU Schools Mace

References

External links
 Page on the John Smith Memorial Mace at the English-Speaking Union website
 Page on the John Smith Memorial Mace at britishdebate.com

British debating competitions
Debating competitions in Ireland
1954 establishments in the United Kingdom
Recurring events established in 1954
Student events
Student organisations in the United Kingdom